Arun Kumar Chakma is an Indian politician and the member of Communist Party of India (Marxist). He was member of the Tripura Legislative Assembly for three consecutive terms from 2003 to 2018 from the Pecharthal Assembly constituency.

References 

1951 births
Living people
Communist Party of India (Marxist) politicians
Tripura politicians
Communist Party of India (Marxist) politicians from Tripura

Year of birth missing (living people)